The Nash 26 is a Canadian sailboat designed by Joe Nash and first built in 1975.

Production
The boat was built by J. J. Nash Industries in Strathroy, Ontario, Canada, but it is now out of production.

Design

The Nash 26 is a small recreational keelboat, built predominantly of fiberglass, with wood trim. It has a masthead sloop rig, a transom-hung rudder and a fixed fin keel. It displaces  and carries  of ballast.

Operational history
In a review Michael McGoldrick wrote, "The Nash 26 ... is a relatively large 26 footer with a nice interior layout which includes the maximum in the way of cruising amenities for a boat in this size range. Despite the priority placed on interior space, it still has acceptable proportions for a cruising boat, although some later Nash 26s appear to have been built with a slightly boxy-looking cabin."

See also
List of sailing boat types

Similar sailboats
Beneteau First 26
Beneteau First 265
C&C 26
C&C 26 Wave
Contessa 26
Dawson 26
Discovery 7.9
Grampian 26
Herreshoff H-26
Hunter 26
Hunter 26.5
Hunter 260
Hunter 270
MacGregor 26
Mirage 26
Nonsuch 26
Outlaw 26
Paceship PY 26
Parker Dawson 26
Pearson 26
Sandstream 26
Tanzer 26
Yamaha 26

References

External links

Keelboats
1970s sailboat type designs
Sailing yachts
Sailboat type designs by Joe Nash
Sailboat types built by Nash Industries